William James Kempling (February 5, 1921 – May 20, 1996) was a Canadian politician. Born in Grimsby, Ontario, he represented the electoral districts of Halton—Wentworth in the House of Commons of Canada from 1972 to 1979, and Burlington from 1979 to 1993.

He was a member of the Progressive Conservative Party of Canada. Kempling is perhaps best known for being a veteran of World War II stationed in Burma. He was a Flight Lieutenant with the R.A.F. and his plane was shot down over the jungles of Burma while on a mission. Surviving the crash, he was subsequently taken prisoner by the Japanese Army and interned in a P.O.W. camp until he was able to escape and make his way through the jungle where he was rescued by a patrol of Ghurka Soldiers that brought him safely out of the jungle to Allied territory.

Electoral record

External links
 

1921 births
1996 deaths
Members of the House of Commons of Canada from Ontario
Progressive Conservative Party of Canada MPs
People from Grimsby, Ontario
Canadian military personnel of World War II
Canadian expatriates in Myanmar